Mohammed Reza Pourmohammad (born 7 February 1987) is an Iranian Football player Kheybar Khorramabad Persian Gulf Pro League .

External links 
 Mohammad Reza Pourmohammad at Soccerway 
 Mohammad Reza Pourmohammad on instagram

Professional
Pourmohammad joined Moghavemat Sepasi in 2009.

Club Career Statistics
Last Update  3 June 2010 

 Assist Goals

References

1987 births
Living people
Iranian footballers
Fajr Sepasi players
Tarbiat Yazd players
Association football midfielders